Indore–Dr. Ambedkar Nagar DEMU is a passenger train of the Indian Railways, which runs between Dr. Ambedkar Nagar railway station and , both within Madhya Pradesh.

Route and halts

The important halts of the train are:

Average speed and frequency
The trains run with an average speed of 23 km/h and complete 21 km in 55 minutes. There are seven trains daily.

References

External links 
 Indore 360

Transport in Indore
Transport in Mhow
Railway services introduced in 2016
Rail transport in Madhya Pradesh
Diesel–electric multiple units of India